Peers is an unincorporated community in southern Warren County, in the U.S. state of Missouri. The community is on the north edge of the Missouri River floodplain and Treloar is four miles to the west on Missouri Route 94.

History
Peers was platted in 1892 when the railroad was extended to that point. A post office called Peers was established in 1893, and remained in operation until 1973. The community has the name of Charles E. Peers, a railroad promoter.

References

Unincorporated communities in Warren County, Missouri
Unincorporated communities in Missouri